Le Doulcet is the name of several persons of the same family:
 Louis Gustave le Doulcet, comte de Pontécoulant, French politician
  Cécile le Doulcet de Pontécoulant,  (1767–1827), sister of Louis Gustave le Doulcet, and first wife of Emmanuel de Grouchy
 Louis Adolphe le Doulcet, comte de Pontécoulant, French soldier and musicologist, one of his sons
 Philippe Gustave le Doulcet, Comte de Pontécoulant, French astronomer, and another one of his sons